Turbine is a 1941 Czech historical drama film directed by Otakar Vávra and starring František Smolík, Lída Baarová and Vlasta Matulová. It is  based on a novel by Karel Matěj Čapek-Chod.

Synopsis
 
The film takes place in the 19th century, when the family of Imperial councilman is experiencing a transition from traditional social values to the new social order, which it does not understand, but must face up to.

Production
It was shot at the Hostivař Studios in Prague.

Cast
 František Smolík as Mills owner Imperial councilman Ullík 
 Lída Baarová as Tynda, Ullík's daughter
 Vlasta Matulová as Marie, Ullík's daughter
 Rudolf Hrušínský as Bonďa, Ullík's son
 Eduard Kohout as Artuš Fabian, Ullík's brother-in-law
 Marie Glázrová as Žofka, Fabian's lover
 Jaroslav Vojta as Night Guard Nezmara
 Vítězslav Vejražka as Václav, Nezmara's son
 Karel Höger as Dr. Arnošt Zouplna
 Jindřich Plachta as Arnošt's father

References

External links

1941 films
1940s Czech-language films
Czechoslovak black-and-white films
Films directed by Otakar Vávra
Czechoslovak drama films
Films set in the 19th century
Czech historical drama films
1940s historical drama films
Films set in Prague
1940s Czech films